Parliamentary elections were held in Andorra on 12 December 1993. Following the adoption of a new constitution by a referendum earlier in the year, they were the first elections in which political parties were allowed to run. The result was a victory for the National Democratic Group, which won eight seats, and its leader Òscar Ribas Reig remained Prime Minister. Voter turnout was 81.0%.

Results

References

Andorra
1993 in Andorra
Parliamentary elections in Andorra
December 1993 events in Europe
Election and referendum articles with incomplete results